Street Gospel is the debut album by the American West Coast hip hop artist Suga Free. It was released on June 24, 1997. The album was produced by DJ Quik. Notable guests include Playa Hamm, Hi-C, and DJ Quik. The album was recorded in 28 days. The album was also released in a clean version, which is out of print. It peaked at #37 on the Billboard Hot 100.

Track listing

References

1997 debut albums
Suga Free albums
West Coast hip hop albums
Albums produced by DJ Quik
Albums produced by G-One